The Taiwan Fertilizer Co., Ltd. (TFC) is a fertilizer company of Taiwan.

History
TFC was established on 1 May 1946 as a state-owned company under the Ministry of Economic Affairs. On 1 September 1999, it was privatized and listed as private corporation. In January 2001, it completed the electronic-class chemical plant supplying chemicals to domestic LCD and semiconductor manufacturers.

Factories
 Keelung
 Miaoli
 Hualien
 Taichung

Organizations
 Administration Department
 Financial Department
 Information Department
 Planning Department
 Business Development Department
 Real Estate Development Department
 Property Management Department
 Sales Department
 Trading Department
 Research and Development Department
 Industrial Safety and Health Department

Transportation
The company headquarter office is accessible within walking distance north west of Songjiang Nanjing Station of Taipei Metro.

See also
 List of companies of Taiwan

References

External links

 

Chemical companies established in 1946
Companies based in Taipei
Fertilizer companies of Taiwan
Taiwanese companies established in 1946